During the 1996–97 English football season, Everton F.C. competed in the FA Premier League (known as the FA Carling Premiership for sponsorship reasons).

Season summary
After finishing sixth the previous season, Everton started the new season with much hope and ambitions of qualifying for Europe or winning a major trophy. But the mid-season sale of top scoring winger Andrei Kanchelskis to Fiorentina sabotaged Everton's chances of more success, and manager Joe Royle resigned in March, less than two years after guiding the club to FA Cup glory. Captain Dave Watson took over as acting manager and confirmed Everton's survival with a 15th-place finish, before Howard Kendall returned to Goodison Park for his third spell as manager.

Final league table

Results summary

Results by round

Results
Everton's score comes first

Legend

FA Premier League

FA Cup

League Cup

Squad

Left club during season

Reserve squad

References

Everton F.C. seasons
Everton